The 1993–94 season saw Leeds United A.F.C. compete in the FA Premier League.

Season summary
After last season's 17th-place finish and failure to win away from home, one season after winning the league title, Howard Wilkinson decided to bolster his squad in order to avoid another torrid season. He paid a club record £2.7 million for Sheffield United striker Brian Deane and by Christmas he had paid a further £2 million for Manchester City midfielder David White. Leeds were now well on the road to recovery, and that recovery process was completed at the end of the season when they finished fifth in the final table.

Final league table

Results
Leeds United's score comes first

Legend

FA Premier League

Results by round

FA Cup

League Cup

Statistics

Transfers

In

Out

Loaned out

Notes

References

Leeds United F.C. seasons
Leeds United
Foot